Alex Sampao (born 31 December 1996) is a Kenyan sprinter.

He won gold at the 2015 African Games as part of the 4x400 metre relay team.

He competed in the men's 400 metres at the 2016 Summer Olympics.

He competed in the man's 800 metres at the 2017 Gavardo Memorial Max Corso (ITA)

References

External links
 

1996 births
Living people
Kenyan male sprinters
Olympic athletes of Kenya
Athletes (track and field) at the 2016 Summer Olympics
Place of birth missing (living people)
African Games gold medalists for Kenya
African Games medalists in athletics (track and field)
Athletes (track and field) at the 2015 African Games